Denis Morris Catholic High School is a Catholic high school located in St. Catharines, Ontario. The school is administered by the Niagara Catholic District School Board.

Denis Morris provides educational programs and services for students with a variety of learning strengths, needs and abilities. 
   
Denis Morris is known well for its many exceptional athletes. In the past the Reds have dominated in Ice Hockey, winning SOSSA for many years in a row, Wrestling, having many athletes reaching the OFSAA championship for the past two years, and Canadian Football, winning numerous championship in the history of the school.

History 
Named after Rev. Denis Morris. Former Pastor of St. Catherine of Alexandria Church in 1909 until 1935 when he died.

Notable alumni 

Linda Evangelista – Supermodel
John Zaritsky – Film maker
Tanya Memme – Television Host, Movie Star, Singer, Model
Owen Nolan – Professional Hockey Player
Dallas Green – Juno Award winner, Singer, Songwriter (Alexisonfire, City and Colour)
Riley Sheahan – collegiate hockey player and 1st round pick of the Detroit Red Wings
David Sutcliffe – Actor
Mark Johnston – Olympic Swimmer

See also
List of high schools in Ontario

References

External links
 Denis Morris Catholic High School

Catholic secondary schools in Ontario
High schools in the Regional Municipality of Niagara
Buildings and structures in St. Catharines
Education in St. Catharines
Educational institutions in Canada with year of establishment missing